"Oh How I Waited" was a minor hit in 1970 for Ron Lowry. It was the second hit for Lowry in the United States. Previously that year he had done very well with "Marry Me".

Background
"Oh How I Waited" bw "Look At Me" was released on Republic 1415 in July 1970. It was Lowry's third single on the record label. With "Marry Me", the song peaked at #39 earlier that year.

Chart performance
In the July 18 issue of Billboard,  "Oh How I Waited" with its strong rhythm was predicted to make the Country Top 20 and surpass his previous hit. In the issued dated September 19, 1970, it peaked at No. 65 on the country singles chart.

References

1969 songs
1970 singles
Songs written by Les Reed (songwriter)
Songs written by Geoff Stephens